The Pale Horse is a BBC One mystery miniseries television serial broadcast in 2020 in two episodes. Written by Sarah Phelps, the serial is loosely based on Agatha Christie's novel of the same name. It is Phelps' fifth adaptation of a Christie work for the BBC. Directed by Leonora Lonsdale, it stars Rufus Sewell and Kaya Scodelario.

Cast

Main
Rufus Sewell as Mark Easterbrook
Sheila Atim as Thryza Grey
Georgina Campbell as Delphine Easterbrook
Bertie Carvel as Zachariah Osborne
Kathy Kiera Clarke as Sybil Stamfordis
James Fleet as Oscar Venables
Henry Lloyd-Hughes as David Ardingly
Claire Skinner as Yvonne Tuckerton
Rita Tushingham as Bella
Sean Pertwee as Inspector Stanley Lejeune
Kaya Scodelario as Hermia Easterbrook

Supporting
Madeleine Bowyer as Jessie Davis
Poppy Gilbert as Thomasina Tuckerton
Ellen Robertson as Poppy
Sarah Woodward as Clemency Ardingly

Production
Filming took place in Bristol. The car driven by Rufus Sewell's character is a Lagonda 3-Litre drophead coupé.

Episodes

Reception
Rotten Tomatoes reports an approval rating of 80% based on 25 reviews, with an average rating of 6.71/10. The site's critics' consensus reads: "Though The Pale Horse bristles with brutal thrills,  convoluted mystery at times sedates the suspenseful proceedings." Metacritic reports an aggregated score of 69 out of 100 based on 6 reviews, indicating "Generally favorable reviews".

The Guardian gave the first episode four stars and praised the writing and direction. The Independent deemed the second episode "satisfying" and said that the updates to the material and language worked. In their review of the second episode, The Telegraph was less complimentary, awarding three stars and saying "writer Sarah Phelps was chucking the rat-filled kitchen sink into this rewrite of Agatha Christie."

As with her previous adaptations, some viewers criticized the numerous and significant changes Phelps made to the original novel; and some criticized the ending, which they found confusing. A Radio Times feature admitted that "the ending is deliberately ambiguous".

References

External links
 
 

2020s British television miniseries
2020 British television series debuts
2020 British television series endings
2020s British drama television series
2020s British crime television series
2020s British mystery television series
English-language television shows
Television series by Mammoth Screen
Television shows based on works by Agatha Christie
Television shows set in the United Kingdom